Andy Kissane, born 13 September 1959, is a Melbourne-born, Sydney-based writer. He has written a number of poetry collections as well as short stories, novels and non-fiction.

Personal life 
Kissane was born in Melbourne, but moved to Sydney in 1987, where he lives in Sydney with his partner and daughter. He has worked as a high school teacher, writer-in-residence and university lecturer. He has also produced audiobooks. Kissane is a supporter of the Brisbane Lions and coaches basketball. He enjoys gardening, especially bushland regeneration. His older brother is the Australian psychiatrist Professor David Kissane.

Awards and Accolades
Kissane has won several awards for his writing, including the Sydney Writers' Festival Poetry Olympics, the Publisher's Cup Cricket Poetry Award, the Harri Jones Memorial Prize for Poetry and the BTG-Blue Dog Poetry reviewing prize. In 2011, his book Out to Lunch was shortlisted for the Kenneth Slessor Prize for Poetry, one of New South Wales Premier's Literary Awards. His poem Searching the Dead was joint winner of the 2019 Peter Porter Poetry Prize.

Bibliography

Poetry
 Facing the moon (Five Islands Press, 1993) 
Every Night They Dance (Five Islands Press, 2000) 
 Out to Lunch (Puncher & Wattmann, 2009) 
Radiance (Puncher & Wattmann, 2014) 
The Tomb of the Unknown Artist (Puncher and Wattmann, 2019)

Fiction

Short story collections
 The Swarm (Puncher & Wattmann, 2012)

Novels
 Under the Same Sun (Sceptre, 2000)

Non-Fiction
 Feeding the Ghost 1: Criticism on Contemporary Australian Poetry (ed. with David Musgrave & Carolyn Rickett) (Puncher & Wattmann, 2018)

References

External links 
 Official website – andykissane.com
The Australia Literature Resource
 ABC The Book Show
 Walleah Press
 Boomerang Books
 Cordite Poetry Review
 The Red Room Company

1959 births
Living people
Australian poets
Quadrant (magazine) people